Gio Linh is a rural district of Quảng Trị province in the North Central Coast region of Vietnam. Gio Linh borders Vĩnh Linh district to the north, Đông Hà to the south.

The planned Quang Tri Airport will be constructed in this district. As of 2003 the district had a population of 73,702. The district covers an area of 474 km2. The district capital lies at Gio Linh. Cồn Tiên is part of Gio Linh.

History

Vietnam War
Gio Linh was the site of the northernmost Allied position during the Vietnam war. It was under the command of the 12th Marine, and the 1967 hill commander was then USMC Major Alfred M. Gray, Jr. who eventually retired in 1991 as General and Commandant of the USMC.  The position was on highway 1 and expanded on an existing 1950-era French fort. The fort was occupied by a company of the Army of Vietnam  First Division. The USMC command had a typical unit strength ranging from 200 to 600 men, depending on the believed level of ground assault risk. During the period April 1967 to September 1967 they suffered 28 killed and 200 wounded.

Divisions 
Gio Linh district is divided into nineteen districts:
 Gio Châu 
 Trung Hải
 Trung Giang 
 Trung Sơn 
 Gio Mỹ 
 Gio Phong 
 Gio An 
 Gio Bình
Gio Hải
 Gio Sơn
 Gio Hòa
 Linh Hải 
 Gio Việt
 Vĩnh Trường
 Hải Thái
 Gio Mai
 Gio Quang
 Linh Thượng 
 Gio Thành

References

Districts of Quảng Trị province